Joshua Mar Nicodemos is a Metropolitan of Nilakal Diocese of Malankara Orthodox Syrian Church.

Early life
H. G. Joshua Mar Nicodemos was born on 8 October 1962. His Grace is a member of St.Thomas Orthodox Valiyapally Kurampala, Pandalam, in the diocese of Chengannoor.

References

1962 births
Living people
Malankara Orthodox Syrian Church bishops